Ronald "Ron" Ramin (born 1953 in New York City) is an American composer for TV, film and, more recently, for the concert hall.

Life and career 
Ron Ramin is the son of composer and orchestrator Sid Ramin.

Ramin grew up in New York City. After graduating from Princeton University, he moved to Los Angeles and began his career as a film composer. He has scored 20 prime-time television series and more than 30 movies for television and miniseries.

In 1994, he was nominated for a Primetime Emmy Award in the category Outstanding Individual Achievement in Music Composition for a Series (dramatic underscore) for his work on the pilot of Christy. At the 18th CableACE Awards in 1996, he was awarded the prize in the category Best Original Score for his work on Rent-a-Kid. He has been presented with both BMI and ASCAP Film & Television Awards at their annual dinners.

Ramin has turned his attention to composing in concert form. His most recent work, Golden State of Mind (2017), is a symphonic suite depicting the beauty and drama of the California landscape, and the diversity of its people, in three movements: Yosemite, San Andreas and Olvera Street. The first movement, formerly titled Greetings! was given its premiere performance by The Marin Symphony, conducted by Alasdair Neale.

Ramin has been married to journalist and author Cathryn Jakobson Ramin since 1988. He is the father of two adult sons and lives with his wife in Northern California. He also spends considerable time in both Los Angeles and New York City. He is a former Board Member of the Society of Composers & Lyricists (The SCL) and is currently a writer and publisher member of ASCAP.

Selected filmography 

 1981–1984: Fantasy Island (TV series) 
 1982–1983: Hart to Hart (TV series)
 1983–1984: The Fall Guy (TV series)
 1984–1988: Cagney & Lacey (TV series)
 1985: Crazy Like a Fox (TV series)
 1986–1987: Mike Hammer (TV series)
 1987: Sledge Hammer! (TV series)
 1987: Frog (TV film)
 1988: Stranger on My Land (TV film)
 1988: The Diamond Trap (TV film)
 1989: Mike Hammer: Murder Takes All (TV film)
 1990: Menu for Murder (TV film)
 1990–1992: The Trials of Rosie O'Neill (TV series) 
 1991: Posing: Inspired by Three Real Stories (TV film)
 1991: Memories of Midnight (TV film)
 1993: They've Taken Our Children: The Chowchilla Kidnapping (TV film)
 1994: The Birds II: Land's End (TV film)
 1994–1995: Christy (TV series) 
 1994: Bionic Ever After? (TV film)
 1994: Come Die with Me: A Mickey Spillane's Mike Hammer Mystery (TV film)
 1995: From the Mixed-Up Files of Mrs. Basil E. Frankweiler (TV film)
 1995: Cagney & Lacey: The View Through the Glass Ceiling (TV film)
 1995: Rent-a-Kid (TV film)
 1995: Dare to Love (TV film)
 1995–1997: Walker, Texas Ranger (TV series)
 1996: Cagney & Lacey: True Convictions (TV film)
 1996: Second Noah (TV Series)
 1996: Terror in the Family (TV film)
 1996: My Son Is Innocent (TV film)
 1996: A Step Toward Tomorrow (TV film)
 1999: Fatal Error (TV film)
 1999: Dogmatic
 1999: Cruel Justice (TV film)
 2006: Falling in Love with the Girl Next Door (TV film)
 2006: Meltdown: Days of Destruction (TV film)
 2006: Home by Christmas (TV film)
 2007: My Neighbor's Keeper (TV film)
 2007: Lost Holiday: The Jim & Suzanne Shemwell Story (TV film)
 2008: Charlie & Me (TV film)
 2008: Lost Behind Bars (TV film)

External links 
 Official website ronramin.com

References 

1953 births
Living people
American film score composers
American male film score composers